Dendrocalamus is a tropical Asian genus of giant clumping bamboos in the grass family. It is found in the Indian subcontinent, China, and Southeast Asia.

Dendrocalamus giganteus is one of the tallest of bamboos, capable of reaching heights up to 46 m.

Species
The following are included:

formerly included
see Ampelocalamus Bambusa Gigantochloa Neololeba Pseudoxytenanthera

References

 
Bambusoideae genera